Eupithecia woodgatata is a moth in the family Geometridae first described by Samuel E. Cassino and Louis W. Swett in 1923. It is found in the US states of Arizona, New Mexico and California.

The wingspan is about 17 mm. Adults have been recorded on wing in August.

References

Moths described in 1923
woodgatata
Moths of North America